Sebastian Ludwig (born 22 March 1988) is a German professional pool player. Ludwig has been successful on the Euro Tour reaching two semi-finals, and also the final of the 2017 Klagenfurt Open where he lost 9–6 to Ralf Souquet.

Ludwig reached ranking 1 in the German Pool Tour in 2017.

References

External links

German pool players
Living people
1988 births